Jani Koivisto (born 25 February 1985) is a Finnish professional footballer who currently plays for FC Viikingit in Helsinki, Finland.

References

External links

Finnish footballers
1985 births
Living people
Veikkausliiga players
FF Jaro players
Association football forwards
FC Viikingit players